Claire Harvey Craig  is a British geophysicist, civil servant and science communicator. Since 2019, she has been Provost of The Queen's College, Oxford.

Education 
Craig was educated at Newnham College, Cambridge, where she gained a BA in natural science in 1982. In 1986, she was awarded a Doctor of Philosophy, also from the University of Cambridge.

Career 
Craig was the Director of Government Office for Science and later Chief Science Policy Officer at the Royal Society.

Craig was appointed Commander of the Order of the British Empire (CBE) in the 2006 Birthday Honours in recognition of her role in the development of Foresight, the UK government’s scientific-based strategic futures program.

On 10 October 2018 it was announced that she had been pre-elected to serve as the next Provost of The Queen's College, Oxford from 2 August 2019; she is the first woman to hold the post.

References

 

 
 
 

Living people
Alumni of Newnham College, Cambridge
Provosts of The Queen's College, Oxford
Year of birth missing (living people)
Science communicators